= Edward H. Fleischman =

American lawyer (born 1932)

Commissioner of the United States Securities and Exchange Commission
- In office 1986–1992
- Nominated by: Ronald Reagan
- Preceded by: James C. Treadway Jr.
- Succeeded by: J. Carter Beese Jr.

Personal details
- Born: June 25, 1932 (age 94) Cambridge, Massachusetts, U.S.
- Party: Republican
- Education: Harvard College (BS); Columbia Law School (JD)
- Occupation: Lawyer

Edward H. Fleischman (born 1932) was an American business lawyer. He served as Securities and Exchange Commissioner between 1986 and 1992. After leaving the SEC, he went back into private practise.
